Muthuthanthrige Rajitha Hiran Chamikara Fernando (born 11 July 1981), popularly known as  Rajitha Hiran is an actor in Sri Lankan Cinema, stage drama and television. Particularly acting in comedy roles, Hiran is best known for the role of Ping Pong in the television serial Thattu Gewal, which became his trademark of the career.

Personal life
Chamikara is an old boy of Prince of Wales' College, Moratuwa.

Chamikara is married to his longtime partner Andrea. They have two daughters. His wife Andrea is from Indian descent and is a Tamil Catholic. Chamikara is a Sinhala Buddhist.

His uncle Hemasiri Sellapperuma is also a renowned artist.

Career
He started acting career through the television series Thattu Gewal. His character Ping Pong was highly popularized. Chamikara started his film career with Cheriyo Holman in 2002, directed by Parakrama Jayasinghe with a minor role. Then he continued to be a popular comedian in his generation and became very popular through the films Somy Boys, Ulath Ekai Pilath Ekai and Kolamba Sanniya Returns. In 2021, he appeared in the stage play Kakkoth Ekka Behe.

Filmography
 No. denotes the Number of Sri Lankan film in the Sri Lankan cinema.

References

External links
Actor Rajitha Hiran Reveals Good News
Hiran Rajitha හිරාන් රජිත
Radio play Nimasara on Sri FM
Rajitha Hiran videos
Dummalawarama marks 10th anniversary
මඩවලට 'පිං පොන්'ගෙනුත් සැර උත්තරයක්
මස් එල්ලෙන නළුවෝ - Rajitha Hiran - ping pong
ගේ ඉස්සරහ හෙලුවෙන් ඉන්න යන රජිත
ඒ අදහස රජිත නිසා වෙනස් වුණා - රජිතගේ බිරිය ඇන්ඩ්‍රියා
පිංපොංගේ අලුත් වැඩක්

Sri Lankan male film actors
Sinhalese male actors
Living people
1981 births